is a  (castle) in Rosenegg, Fieberbrunn, Austria. It was built by Baron Rosenberg in 1187 and takes its name from the Rosenberg family, which governed the surrounding area from 1534 to 1872. Since 1938, it has been operated as a hotel, now rated at four stars.

It is said that Napoleon stayed at the castle in 1809, after the battle of Pass Stub.

 
A tunnel links the castle to a more modern extension.

References

External links 

 Official website

Buildings and structures in Upper Austria